The Pirre warbler (Basileuterus ignotus) is a species of bird in the family Parulidae.
It is found in the borderline area of Panama and Colombia.
Its natural habitat is subtropical or tropical moist montane forests.
It is threatened by habitat loss.

References

External links
BirdLife Species Factsheet.

Pirre warbler
Birds of Panama
Birds of Colombia
Pirre warbler
Taxonomy articles created by Polbot